is a 2014 Japanese animated psychological drama film co-written and directed by Hiromasa Yonebayashi, produced by Studio Ghibli and distributed by Toho. It is based on Joan G. Robinson's 1967 novel of the same name.

The film follows Anna Sasaki while she stays with her relatives in a town in the Kushiro wetlands in Hokkaido. Anna comes across a nearby abandoned mansion, where she meets Marnie, a mysterious girl who asks her to promise to keep their secrets from everyone. As summer progresses, Anna spends more time with Marnie and learns the truth about her family and foster care.

The film featured the final work for Studio Ghibli animator Makiko Futaki, who died in May 2016. It was also the final film that Yonebayashi directed for Ghibli before he left and joined Studio Ponoc. The film received positive reviews from critics, who praised its animation, music, vocal performances, and emotional story. It was released in theatres on 19 July 2014, and on Blu-ray and DVD in Japan on 18 March 2015. It was nominated for the Academy Award for Best Animated Feature at the 88th Academy Awards, but it lost to Inside Out.

Plot 

Anna Sasaki is a 12-year-old girl with low self-esteem living in Sapporo with foster parents, Yoriko and her husband. One day, Anna suffers an asthma attack at school. At the doctor's recommendation to send Anna to a place where the air is clean, Yoriko decides to have her spend summer break with Yoriko's relatives, Setsu and Kiyomasa Oiwa, who live in a rural seaside town located between Kushiro and Nemuro.

Anna investigates an abandoned mansion across a salt marsh. She recognizes it, but the tide ensnares her and keeps her there until Toichi, an elderly fisherman, finds her. Anna sees a blonde haired girl in the mansion. On the night of the Tanabata festival, she meets the girl, Marnie. The two agree to keep their meetings secret. Marnie invites Anna to a party at the mansion, where she sees Marnie dancing with a boy named Kazuhiko.

Anna meets Hisako, an older woman who paints. Hisako comments that Anna's sketches look like a girl whom she knew when she was young. A family moves into the mansion. During the move-in, Anna meets a girl named Sayaka, who gives her Marnie's diary that had been hidden in a drawer. Anna tells Marnie she found documents that show her foster parents are paid to take care of her. She makes the assumption that they only pretend to love her for the money, and says she can’t forgive her biological family for leaving her behind and dying. Marnie shares how her parents are always traveling abroad, and how she is left behind with her cruel nanny. The maids bully her and threaten to lock her in the silo near the mansion. Anna leads Marnie to the silo to confront the latter’s fear of it. Marnie conquers her fear and Kazuhiko comforts Marnie.

Sayaka finds the missing pages from Marnie's diary, which include passages about Kazuhiko and the silo. She and her brother find Anna unconscious with a high fever. They bring her back to the Oiwas, where Anna confronts Marnie. Marnie says she is sorry for leaving her and that she cannot see Anna anymore. When Anna recovers, Hisako reveals Marnie's story: Marnie married Kazuhiko and had a daughter named Emily, but he died from a sudden illness and Marnie committed herself to a sanatorium to cope with her loss. With no other family to care for her, Emily was sent to a boarding school. Marnie recovered but a preteen Emily was resentful for her mother abandoning her. In her adulthood, Emily ran away from home and had a daughter herself, but she and her husband were killed in a car accident. Marnie raised her granddaughter, who was placed in foster care after her death.

At the end of the summer, Yoriko arrives to take Anna home and is delighted to see Anna with her new friends, Hisako, Toichi, and Sayaka. She gives Anna a photograph of the mansion and says it belonged to Anna's grandmother. When Anna sees Marnie's name written on the back, she realizes that she is Emily's daughter and Marnie's granddaughter. This revelation brings closure about her identity. Yoriko tells Anna about the government payments but reassures her that they have always loved her. For the first time, Anna calls Yoriko her mother.

Anna says goodbye to her new friends and promises to visit again next summer before seeing Marnie at the mansion window, waving goodbye to her.

Voice cast

Production 
The original novel by Joan G. Robinson had previously been cited by Hayao Miyazaki as one of his favorite children's novels. Hiromasa Yonebayashi was assigned the project by Ghibli producer Toshio Suzuki, who asked him to change the setting of the story to Japan. Yonebayashi found the story moving, but he "thought it would be very difficult to visualize as a film," and initially turned down the role. His interest was later renewed and he began to conceive new elements for the story, such as Anna's characterization as an artist. Although the setting was changed, the decision was made to retain Marnie's appearance as blonde and blue-eyed, though Miyazaki was opposed to this decision. According to Ghibli producer Yoshiaki Nishimura, Miyazaki judged the usage of Marnie's character "plain outdated and cheesy" to promote the film, although Nishimura clarified that catching people's attention with her appearance never had been their intention.

Yonebayashi intended the film to be encouraging to children in Japan who felt lonely and isolated, and hoped that "when they see Marnie, maybe they could take a little step forward".  Key focus was placed upon highly detailed character movements and backgrounds, as well as depicting the details of Anna's experience in the environment. The Marsh House that is central to the story was designed by Yohei Taneda, who Yonebayashi asked "to draw the Marsh House as if it were another character who watches over Anna." Taneda scouted buildings in Hokkaido for inspiration.

Music

The first "Image Song" disc features music composed to express the personality of the characters and feel of places in the film. The second disc features all the background music for the film. Priscilla Ahn, the writer and performer of the movie's theme song, "Fine on the Outside", also released an accompanying album to the film called Just Know That I Love You on 16 July 2014.

Track listing

Release
When Marnie Was There was released in Japan on July 19, 2014. On 14 January, GKIDS announced that they would be distributing the film for a North American release on May 22, 2015. The film premièred at the New York International Children's Film Festival on 27 February 2015. The film had its UK premiere during the BFI London Film Festival on 10 October 2015 with a wider release scheduled for 10 June 2016.

The film was released on Blu-ray and DVD in Japan by Walt Disney Studios Japan on 18 March 2015, and released on Blu-ray and DVD in America by Universal Pictures Home Entertainment on October 6, 2015.

Reception

Box office
When Marnie Was There opened at third place, grossing  during its opening weekend in Japan. By the end of 2014, the film had grossed  in Japan.

In North America, the film had grossed  by its third weekend, and went on to gross $561,085 in the United States and Canada. In South Korea, it grossed  in 2015.

Home media 
In Japan, the Blu-ray release sold 15,224 units  and the DVD release sold 28,560 units , for a combined total of at least  physical home video units sold in Japan.

In the United States, the film grossed $3,478,150 from Blu-ray and DVD sales.

In the United Kingdom, it was 2016's third best-selling foreign language film on home video (behind Victor Young Perez and Ip Man 3). It was later 2017's eighth best-selling foreign language film in the UK, and the year's fourth best-selling Japanese film (behind the anime films Your Name, My Neighbor Totoro, and Yu-Gi-Oh! The Dark Side of Dimensions).

Book sales
Following the success of the film, Robinson's original novel experienced a boost in sales internationally. Her agent Caroline Sheldon sold the rights of the book to 10 countries, including Japan, Italy, Spain and China. The book was also re-released in English by HarperCollins Children's Books as part of its classics range.

Critical response
When Marnie Was There received positive reviews. On review aggregator website Rotten Tomatoes, the film holds an approval rating of 91%, based on 99 reviews, with an average rating of 7.47/10. The website's critical consensus reads, "When Marnie Was There is still blessed with enough visual and narrative beauty to recommend, even if it isn't quite as magical as Studio Ghibli's greatest works." On Metacritic, the film has a score of 72 out of 100, based on 22 critics, indicating "generally favorable reviews".

Accolades

References

External links

 
  
 
 
 

2014 anime films
Toho animated films
Anime films based on novels
Animated films about families
Films based on British novels
Films directed by Hiromasa Yonebayashi
Nippon TV films
Films set in Japan
Films set in Hokkaido
Anime and manga set in Hokkaido
Animated films about friendship
Films about child abuse
Films set in country houses
Japanese ghost films
Studio Ghibli animated films
2010s children's animated films
Japanese psychological drama films
2010s psychological drama films
Psychological drama films